The IEEE Daniel E. Noble Award is a Technical Field Award of the IEEE for contributions to emerging technologies. The award is named after Daniel E. Noble. The award was established by the IEEE Board of Directors in 2000, replacing the prior IEEE Morris N. Liebmann Memorial Award.

The award may be presented to an individual or a team of up to three people.

Recipients receive a bronze medal, certificate and honorarium.

Recipients 

 2020: Miroslav Micovic
 2019: Thomas Kenny
 2018: Rajiv Joshi
 2017: Miguel A. L. Nicolelis
 2016: Mark G. Allen (USA)
 2015: Khalil Najafi
 2014: Gabriel M. Rebeiz
 2013: Jan P. Allebach
 2012: Subramanian S. Iyer
 2011: Mark L. Burgener
 2011: Ronald E. Reedy (USA)
 2010: Shinichi Abe
 2010: Shoichi Sasaki
 2010: Takehisa Yaegashi (Japan)
 2009: Larry F. Weber (USA)
 2008: James M. Daughton
 2008: Stuart Parkin (UK)
 2008: Saied Tehrani
 2007: Stephen R. Forrest	
 2007: Richard H. Friend
 2007: Ching W. Tang (USA)	
 2006: Carlos A. Paz de Araujo (Brazil)
 2005: David L. Harame		
 2004: Larry J. Hornbeck	
 2003: 
 2002: 
 2001: Katsutoshi Izumi	
 2000 and earlier: See IEEE Morris N. Liebmann Memorial Award

References

External links 
 IEEE Daniel E. Noble Award for Emerging Technologies
 List of recipients of the IEEE Daniel E. Noble Award for Emerging Technologies

Daniel E. Noble Award